The 1st Cossack Volunteer Cavalry Regiment was a volunteer of Don Cossack cavalry regiment that served in the Don Army during the Russian Civil War. The unit was formed in March–April 1918 by Colonel Alexei V. Kravtzov to serve with the forces of Don Army in the opening stages of Russian Civil War. Included to the Army Corps of Gen. Tatarkin on May 19.

Civil War
Cossacks from the Ust-Medveditskaya okrug was brought together by Colonel Alexey V. Kravtzov at the stanitsa Ust-Medveditskaya, on Don Republic territories in preparation for an anti-Bolshevik action in Don Host Oblast. After that was involved in numerous battles during the months-long prelude of the Russian Civil War in Don Host Oblast, including the ill-fated Battle of Loznoye from December 22 to December 30, 1918, where regiment save by manoeuvre corps of Don Army under command of General Golubintzev. In this battle Colonel Kravtzov shot himself not to fall into the Bolshevik hands.
In March 1919 part of 4th Don Cossacks Cavalry Division.

Commanders
 Colonel Alexei V. Kravtzov. 
 Colonel Grigori V. Tatarkin

See also
 List of Don Army Units in the Civil War
 White movement
 Don Army
 Volunteer Army
 Russian Civil War

Notes

References
  Golubintzev, A.V., Russian Vandea
 Volkov S.V.: Tragedy of the Russian officer corps.  Officers in White movement
 Volkov S.V.: White movement in Russia: Organisation and structure. 2000

Military units and formations established in 1918
Military units and formations of the Russian Civil War
History of the Don Cossacks
Cossack military units and formations
Military units and formations disestablished in 1918